Charlotte Römer Paredes (born 8 January 1994) is an Ecuadorian former tennis player of German descent.

In her career, she won one singles title and ten doubles titles on the ITF Women's Circuit. On 9 September 2019, she reached a career-high singles ranking of world No. 539. On 15 May 2017, she peaked at No. 424 in the doubles rankings.

Playing for the Ecuador Fed Cup team, Römer has a win–loss record of 16–18.

ITF Circuit finals

Singles: 3 (1 title, 2 runner-ups)

Doubles: 25 (10 titles, 15 runner-ups)

References

External links

 
 
 

1994 births
Living people
People from Tungurahua Province
Ecuadorian female tennis players
Ecuadorian people of German descent
Tennis players at the 2015 Pan American Games
South American Games bronze medalists for Ecuador
South American Games medalists in tennis
Competitors at the 2018 South American Games
Tennis players at the 2019 Pan American Games
Pan American Games competitors for Ecuador
21st-century Ecuadorian women